Sandringham can refer to:

Places 
 Sandringham, New South Wales, Australia
 Sandringham, Queensland, Australia
 Sandringham, Victoria, Australia
Sandringham railway line
Sandringham railway station
Electoral district of Sandringham
 Sandringham, Newfoundland and Labrador, Canada
 Sandringham, New Zealand, New Zealand
 Sandringham, Gauteng, Johannesburg, South Africa
Sandringham, Norfolk, England, UK
Sandringham House, one of the private residences of the British monarch

Other uses
HMS Sandringham, the name of a number of Royal Navy ships
Sandringham College, in Melbourne, Australia
Sandringham Football Club, an Australian rules football club in Melbourne, Australia
Sandringham School, in St Albans, England
Short Sandringham, a civilian version of the Short Sunderland flying boat

See also

Sandringham Hotel (disambiguation)
Sandringham Summit, a 2020 meeting to discuss the future of the Duke and Duchess of Sussex
Sandringham time, the idiosyncratic timekeeping at the royal estate under Edward VII